William de Lanvallei III (died 1217) was an English landowner, governor of Colchester Castle. He was lord of Walkern, Hertfordshire.

Relationship with King John
William III accompanied King John of England on his expedition to Poitou in 1214 and was present at the truce. William III was an enforcer of the Magna Carta and was related to several of the Magna Carta barons (see "family" section below).

Family
William was the grandson of the founder of the family fortune, William de Lanvallai I, a Breton.
William I (1125-1180), was an administrator for Henry II of England after his takeover of the duchy of Brittany in 1166. William served in the office for five years, crossing to England in 1171 or 1172. to become the king's castellan of Winchester. William I married Gunnora, the daughter of Hubert de Saint Clair (1120-1155).

William II (c.1161-1204), son of William I, married Hawise, great-granddaughter of Hugh de Bocland (Buckland, Oxfordshire).

William III, son of William II, married Maud, daughter of Gilbert (Hamon) Peche. Maud was niece of Robert Fitzwalter, a leader of the Magna Carta barons.

Hawise, daughter of William III, was placed as ward with Hubert de Burgh. Hubert married Hawise to his son, John.

References

External links
 website for Walkern History Society
 website for the Magna Carta Barons Association

12th-century births
1217 deaths
12th-century English people
13th-century English people
Anglo-Normans
Magna Carta barons
People from Colchester
People from Hertfordshire
English landowners
English feudal barons